Ah Muzen Cab is the Maya god of bees and honey.  He is possibly the same figure as "the Descending God" or "the Diving God" and is consistently depicted upside-down. The Temple of the Descending God is located in Tulum. The bees used by the Maya are Melipona beecheii and Melipona yucatanica, species of stingless bee.

In popular culture
Ah Muzen Cab is a playable god in the video game Smite.

See also
 Bee (mythology)

References

 
 

Maya gods

Mythological insects
Insects in religion